Angela von den Driesch (11 July 1934 – 4 January 2012) was a German archaeologist and veterinarian. She was a professor and former director of the Institut für Paläoanatomie, Domestikationsforschung und Geschichte der Tiermedizin at the Ludwig Maximilian University of Munich.

Education and career 
Angela Felicitas Karpf was born on 11 July 1934 in Dresden but her family moved to Tegernsee, Bavaria after the Second World War. She studied in Munich and Zürich, first reading Romance languages, then veterinary medicine. She was awarded the degree of Doctor Medicinae Veterinariae by Ludwig Maximilian University of Munich in 1963 for her thesis on the lymphatic system of the testicle. She married Karl von den Driesch in 1966.

In 1965, Angela von den Driesch joined Munich's newly founded Institut für Paläoanatomie, Domestikationsforschung und Geschichte der Tiermedizin (Institute for Palaeoanatomy, Domestication Research and the History of Veterinary Medicine), directed by Joachim Boessneck. She completed her habilitation thesis, on the osteoarchaeology of the Iberian Peninsula, in 1970. She was made a university professor in 1978 and succeeded Boessnick as the director of the Institute for Palaeoanatomy in 1991. On her retirement in 1999, she managed to persuade the university not to close the institute, and  continues as the only combined  in palaeoanatomy and veterinary history in Germany.

Legacy 
A festschrift in von den Driesch's honour, Historia animalium ex ossibus, was edited by Cornelia Becker, Henriette Manhart, Joris Peters, and Jörg Schibler and published in 1999. Thirty-seven papers were contributed in German, English and French. On her death, an international symposium in her memory was held at Koç University in Istanbul.

Von den Driesch began building a reference collection of vertebrate bones when she joined the Institute for Palaeoanatomy in the 1960s, which grew to become one of the largest osteological collections in the world. At the time of her death in 2012, it contained over 20,000 specimens representing 2,700 taxa. When she retired in 1999, von den Driesch arranged for the collection to be given to the Bavarian state. It was later merged with the state anthropological collection and is now known as the Bavarian State Collection for Anthropology and Palaeoanatomy (Staatssammlung für Anthropologie und Paläoanatomie).

References 

1934 births
Archaeologists from Dresden
People from Miesbach (district)
Zooarchaeologists
Archaeologists of the Near East
German women archaeologists
German veterinarians
Women veterinarians
Ludwig Maximilian University of Munich alumni
Academic staff of the Ludwig Maximilian University of Munich
2012 deaths